California's 12th congressional district is a congressional district in northern California. Barbara Lee, a Democrat, has represented the district since January 2023. The district was also once represented by Richard Nixon, at a time when the district encompassed Pasadena, Pomona, and Whittier.

Currently, the 12th district is located in Alameda County and includes the cities of Oakland, Berkeley, Emeryville, Alameda, Albany, Piedmont, San Leandro and most of San Lorenzo. The 12th district is the most Democratic district in the United States, giving nearly 90% of its vote to Democrats in both the 2016 and 2020 presidential elections.

Before redistricting in 2023, the 12th district was within San Francisco, encompassing most of the city. The remainder of the city was included in the 14th district.

History
When the district was created after the 1930 census, it was located in Los Angeles County. As California's population grew, however, the district generally was moved northward, eventually to the San Francisco peninsula.

Richard Nixon, who would subsequently serve as the 37th president of the United States, represented this district from 1947 to 1951. Nancy Pelosi, the former speaker of the House, represented the district from 2013-2023. She had previously served California's 5th congressional district from 1987 to 1993 and California's 8th congressional district from 1993 to 2013 and currently represents California's 11th congressional district.

Recent election results from statewide races

Composition

Due to the 2020 redistricting, California's 12th district has effectively been shifted to the former geography of the 13th district. It encompasses the coastal section of Alameda, and is anchored by Oakland. This district borders the 13th district, and Alameda County is partitioned between them by Grant Ave, Union Pacific, Lewelling Blvd, Wicks Blvd, Manor Blvd, Juniper St, Dayton Ave, Padre Ave, Fargo Ave, Edgemoor St, Trojan Ave, Beatty St, Fleming St, Highway 880, Floresta Blvd, Halcyon Dr, Hesperian Blvd, Thornally Dr, Highway 185, 150th Ave, Highway 580, Benedict Dr, San Leandro Creek, and Lake Chabot Regional Park. Alongside Oakland, the 12th district takes in the cities of Alameda, Albany, Berkeley, Emeryville, Piedmont, and San Leandro.

Cities
 Oakland - 440,646
 Berkeley - 124,321
 San Leandro - 91,008
 Alameda - 77,624
 Albany - 20,271
 Emeryville - 12,905
 Piedmont - 11,270

List of members representing the district

Election results

1932

1934

1936

1938

1940

1942

1944

1946

1948

1950

1952

1954

1956

1958

1960

1962

1964

1966

1968

1970

1972

1974

1976

1978

1980

1982

1984

1986

1988

1990

1992

1994

1996

1998

2000

2002

2004

2006

2008 (Special)

2008

2010

2012

2014

2016

2018

2020

See also

List of United States congressional districts

References

External links
GovTrack.us: California's 12th congressional district
RAND California Election Returns: District Definitions (out of date)
California Voter Foundation map – CD12 (out of date)

12
Government of San Francisco
Constituencies established in 1933
1933 establishments in California